Rajya Sabha elections were held in 1995, to elect members of the Rajya Sabha, Indian Parliament's upper chamber. 2 members from Assam and 6 members from Tamil Nadu  were elected.

Elections
Elections were held in 1995 to elect members from various states.
The list is incomplete.

Members elected
The following members are elected in the elections held in 1995. They are members for the term 1995-2001 and retire in year 2001, except in case of the resignation or death before the term.

State - Member - Party

Bye-elections
The following bye elections were held in the year 1995.

State - Member - Party

 Andhra Pradesh - Dr Mohan Babu - TDP (  ele  18/04/1995 term till 2000 )
 Kerala - Joy Nadukkara - OTH (  ele  27/10/1995 term till 1997 )
 Kerala - K. Karunakaran - INC (  ele  25/04/1995 term till 1997 )

References

1995 elections in India
1995